The Kentucky Colonels were a member of the American Basketball Association for all of the league's nine years. The name is derived from the historic Kentucky colonels.  The Colonels won the most games and had the highest winning percentage of any franchise in the league's history, but the team did not join the NBA in the 1976 ABA–NBA merger.   The downtown Louisville Convention Center (now known as The Gardens) was the Colonels' original venue for the first three seasons before moving to Freedom Hall for the remaining seasons, beginning with the 1970–71 schedule.

The Kentucky Colonels were only one of two ABA teams, along with the Indiana Pacers, to play for the entire duration of the league without relocating, changing its team name, or folding.  The Colonels were also the only major league franchise in Kentucky since the Louisville Breckenridges left the National Football League in 1923.

Overview and background
The Louisville-based Colonels started their time in the ABA as a colorful franchise, and not just because of their bright chartreuse green uniforms. Among the things they were known for was their "mascot" Ziggy, a prize-winning Brussels Griffon dog that was owned by original team owners Joe and Mamie Gregory.

They were equally famous for publicity stunts, their most famous coming in 1968 when Penny Ann Early, the first licensed female horse racing jockey, was signed to appear in an ABA game (albeit for a few seconds).

The early color of their franchise began to wane during the 1970–71 season, when they signed another Wildcat star in All-American Dan Issel. They also dropped the chartreuse green uniforms in favor of a blue and white scheme similar to that of the Wildcats. Another abnormality to the Colonels uniform change was that the players' last names on the back had only the first letter capitalized, as opposed to all capital letters, which are almost universally featured on the back of nearly every professional or collegiate basketball uniform which names on the back of jerseys are featured. Issel's signing helped the Colonels become well known as a legitimate basketball team. Despite an average record in the regular season, they made a serious run at the 1971 ABA championship. They fell just short, however, and lost to the Utah Stars in seven games.

They proved to be even better in 1971, with the signing of Artis Gilmore. Gilmore's signing would help make the Colonels a legitimate powerhouse for years to come. The Colonels won 68 games in his rookie campaign under coach Joe Mullaney; their record turned out to be best in the league's entire history. Yet, in the playoffs, they were upset by the New York Nets in the first round. Kentucky recovered and made another championship run during the 1972–73 playoffs, but lost a physical series to the Indiana Pacers in 7 games, 4 games to 3.

After the season, the franchise was nearly moved out-of-state to Cincinnati, but was purchased by John Y. Brown, Jr., a future Kentucky governor who owned Kentucky Fried Chicken for years. Brown helped increase interest in the team, and looked to improve its on-court performance by hiring popular ABA coach Babe McCarthy. But after they were swept in the second round of the playoffs by the Nets, Brown gave McCarthy his walking papers.

For the 1974–75 season, Brown hired Hubie Brown (no relation), a former NBA assistant coach, to give them that championship. Unlike the past year, the Colonels would not be denied. After a torrid finish to the regular season, which saw them win 23 of 26 games, they ripped through the playoffs, and beat their nemesis, the Indiana Pacers, in a dominant 4 games to 1 victory to win the 1975 ABA championship. Gilmore scored 28 points and grabbed an amazing 31 rebounds in the final game. That same season the Golden State Warriors won the NBA Title. Colonels owner, John Y. Brown, offered the NBA Champs a million dollars to play a one-game world championship. The Warriors and the NBA refused.

The celebration of the 1975 season ended when John Y. Brown, Jr. dealt Dan Issel to the ABA's new Baltimore Claws franchise (which folded after a few preseason exhibition games, never taking the floor in the regular season) for financial reasons. They acquired all-star Caldwell Jones to replace him, but he never gelled with the team. Jones was dealt mid-season for young Maurice Lucas. Hubie managed to make the team competitive, but they lost in the postseason to the Denver Nuggets in 7 games.

Kentucky was one of the league's strongest teams both on and off the court. It boasted a talented roster and had one of its best fan bases. However, during merger talks with the NBA, the older league’s Chicago Bulls objected to the Colonels being part of the merger. They owned the NBA rights to Artis Gilmore, and desperately wanted him on their roster. As a result, John Y. Brown, Jr. was forced to fold the Colonels. Brown would indeed get an NBA franchise: he purchased the Buffalo Braves in 1976, then traded it for the Boston Celtics two years later.

Colonels players were distributed to other teams in a dispersal draft, with Gilmore going to Chicago. Maurice Lucas went on to be an all-star for the Portland Trail Blazers and Louie Dampier, who ended up being the all-time leader in points and assists, ended his career as a sixth man for the San Antonio Spurs. Coach Hubie Brown went on to coach the Atlanta Hawks for five seasons after the merger before being fired.

The Colonels won 448 games in the ABA, more than any other team or franchise. The Colonels' overall regular season record was 448–296; their .602 winning percentage is better than that of any ABA franchise except for the Minnesota Muskies who only played one season. (If the Utah Stars' statistics are counted on their own, excluding their seasons as the Anaheim Amigos and the Los Angeles Stars, that team's winning percentage, .608, is slightly better than the Colonels'.)

The Colonels' playoff record was 55–46 (.545). Only the Indiana Pacers won more ABA playoff games (69).

Year-by-year results

1967–1968
On March 6, 1967, the American Basketball Association awarded the franchise that became the Kentucky Colonels to Don Regan for $30,000. Later that year the franchise was bought by Joseph Gregory, Mamie Gregory and William C. Boone.

John Givens was named as the first coach of the Colonels.

The Colonels draft picks were used on UK standout Louie Dampier, who signed with the Colonels; Western Kentucky University standout Clem Haskins, who signed with the NBA's Chicago Bulls; Bob Verga, who signed with Dallas, and Randy Mahaffey, who signed with the Colonels. The team also signed Darel Carrier (WKU) and Jim "Goose" Ligon (from Kokomo, Indiana). The Colonels' 1967–68 roster was rounded out with Kendall Rhine (Rice University), Stew Johnson (Murray State), Rubin Russell, Bill Bradley (Tennessee Tech), Cotton Nash (UK), Bobby Rascoe (WKU), Howard Bayne (Tennessee), Orbie Bowling (Tennessee) and Tommy Woods.

The Colonels played their home games at the Kentucky Fair and Exposition Center (Freedom Hall) and at the Louisville Convention Center (now Louisville Gardens). The team only won 5 of their first 17 games, leading to Givens being fired as coach. He was replaced by Gene Rhodes. In November, Stew Johnson was traded to the New Jersey Americans for Jim Caldwell. Darel Carrier, Randy Mahaffey and Louie Dampier played in the ABA All Star game but the team finished with a record of 36 wins and 42 losses, tying New Jersey for fourth place in the Eastern Division. For the season the Colonels averaged 3,225 fans per game.

The Colonels and Americans scheduled a one-game playoff game to determine who would get the playoff bid slated for the Eastern Division's fourth place team. The game was scheduled at the Long Island Arena, as New Jersey's Teaneck Armory was unavailable, but the facility was in such poor condition that the game could not be played, and the Colonels won by forfeit. The Colonels then advanced to the Eastern Division semifinals where they lost to the Minnesota Muskies 3 games to 2.

1968–1969
Among the Colonels' draft picks was University of Louisville star Wes Unseld, who opted to take a higher paying deal with the NBA's Baltimore franchise. The Colonels also drafted Manny Leaks and Gene Moore, who signed with the team. Sam Smith was acquired from Minnesota and then Randy Mahaffey and Manny Leaks were traded to the New York Nets for Oliver Darden and Andy Anderson.

The Colonels hosted the 1969 ABA All-Star Game in Louisville. Kentucky coach Gene Rhodes was the head coach for the East team, which lost to the West 133–127. Darel Carrier and Louie Dampier repeated as ABA All Stars and were joined by Kentucky's Jim "Goose" Ligon.

During this season the Colonels fielded the first ever female professional basketball player when jockey Penny Ann Early joined the team for pregame warmups and appeared briefly during a game.

The Colonels finished in third place in the Eastern Division with a 42–36 record. Their average home attendance was 4,157.

In the Eastern Division semifinals the Colonels lost a tight series to their rival the Indiana Pacers, 4 games to 3.

1969–1970
The Colonels used their draft picks to select Bob Dandridge, who joined the Milwaukee Bucks of the NBA and Herm Gilliam, who signed with the NBA's Cincinnati franchise. Bud Olsen, former Kentucky Wesleyan College star George Tinsley, future Kentucky Wesleyan coach Wayne Chapman and former University of Kentucky star Tommy Kron were added to the roster.

In April 1969 the Colonels were bought by a group of Louisville investors that included H. Wendell Cherry, Bill DeWitt, J. David Grissom, Stuart P. Jay, David A. Jones, John Y. Brown, Jr. and Mike Storen. Storen had previously been the president and general manager of the Indiana Pacers. The group then hired former University of Kentucky star Alex Groza as the team's business manager.

Darel Carrier and Louie Dampier again appeared in the ABA All Star Game and were joined by Gene Moore.

The Colonels finished the season with a record of 45–39 which was good for second place in the Eastern Division.

The Colonels defeated the New York Nets 4 games to 3 in the Eastern Division semifinals but lost in the Eastern Division finals to the Indiana Pacers, 4 games to 1.

1970–1971

In July the Colonels traded Jim "Goose" Ligon, Gene Moore and Bud Olsen to Dallas for Cincy Powell. They also signed University of Kentucky star Dan Issel. Issel was given a 10-year contract worth $1.4 million. The Colonels also traded a draft pick to the New York Nets for Walt Simon. Mike Pratt joined the Colonels' roster for the season.

The Colonels began the regular season with a 10–5 record, resulting in coach Gene Rhodes being fired. Rhodes was briefly replaced by Alex Groza, who won both games he coached. Groza was quickly replaced as coach by Frank Ramsey, the former star for the University of Kentucky and the Boston Celtics.

Kentucky's Dan Issel and Cincy Powell played in the ABA All-Star Game. Issel was named Co-Rookie of the Year, along with Charlie Scott of the Virginia Squires.

The Colonels finished the regular season with a record of 44–40 and in second place in the Eastern Division. Their average home attendance for the season was 7,375. Beginning with this season the Colonels moved their home games from the Louisville Convention Center (now Louisville Gardens) to Freedom Hall.

The Colonels defeated The Floridians 4 games to 2 in the Eastern Division semifinals and defeated the Virginia Squires 4 games to 2 in the Eastern Division finals. Facing the Utah Stars in the ABA championship, the Colonels and Stars each won three games before Utah pulled out Game 7 at home in front of an ABA record crowd. The Colonels finished as the league's runner up.

1971–1972
The Colonels' draft picks included Artis Gilmore, John Roche and Mike Gale, who all signed with Kentucky, and Fred Brown and Larry Steele, who signed with the Seattle SuperSonics and Portland Trail Blazers of the NBA, respectively. The Colonels then sold Roche to the New York Nets. Gilmore, like Issel, signed a contract for 10 years and $1.5 million. Joe Mullaney was named coach of the Colonels.

On September 22, 1971, the Colonels played in the second ever ABA vs. NBA preseason exhibition game.  13,821 fans watched the Colonels defeat the Baltimore Bullets 111–85 in Freedom Hall. It was the ABA's first win against the NBA, as the ABA's Dallas Chaparrals had lost to the NBA's Milwaukee Bucks 106–103 the night before in the first ever matchup between the two leagues.

On October 8, 1971, the Colonels hosted the Milwaukee Bucks and Kareem Abdul-Jabbar at Freedom Hall in front of over 18,000 fans. Dan Issel scored 34 points and Artis Gilmore posted 18 points, 16 rebounds and 5 blocked shots. However, Abdul-Jabbar had 30 points, 20 rebounds and 3 blocked shots and the Bucks edged the Colonels, 99–93. The very next night the Colonels hosted the New York Knicks in Freedom Hall. The Knicks won, 112–100, before 12,238 fans.

The Colonels had a terrific regular season. Mullaney coached in the ABA All Star Game, heading up the East team which won 142–115. Dan Issel, Louie Dampier and Artis Gilmore each played in the All Star Game for the East team; Issel was the game's Most Valuable Player. Gilmore ended up as the league's Most Valuable Player at the end of the season and was also the league's Rookie of the Year. Gilmore's impressive statistics included leading the league with 3,666 minutes in play, a field goal percentage of 59.8% and an average of 17.8 rebounds per game. Gilmore and Issel were both on the All-ABA First Team.

Kentucky finished the season with the best record ever posted in ABA play, with 68 wins and 16 losses, a winning percentage of .810. This secured the Colonels' first ever first-place finish in the Eastern Division. The Colonels' average home attendance was 8,811.

Kentucky's remarkable season came to a surprising end when the Colonels lost in the Eastern Division semifinals to the New York Nets, 4 games to 2.

1972–1973
Prior to the season the Colonels traded Cincy Powell to the Utah Stars for a draft pick and cash, and bought Rick Mount from the Indiana Pacers for $250,000. Wendell Ladner joined the Colonels' roster for the season.

In preseason play, on September 23, 1972, the Colonels hosted the NBA's Atlanta Hawks for an exhibition game in Frankfort. Julius Erving played for the Hawks, posting 28 points and 18 rebounds in 42 minutes. The Hawks prevailed, 112–99. On September 30, 1972 the Colonels traveled to Phoenix, Arizona for an exhibition game against the Phoenix Suns. The Colonels won, 120–118. On October 1, 1972 the Milwaukee Bucks returned to Freedom Hall. Oscar Robertson and Kareem Abdul-Jabbar each scored 20 points as the Bucks beat the Colonels 131–100. On October 6, 1972 the Phoenix Suns played the Colonels at Freedom Hall. The Suns won, 103–91. The next night the Colonels lost a close game to the Baltimore Bullets, 95–93.

Louie Dampier, Dan Issel and Artis Gilmore returned to the ABA All-Star Game. Gilmore was again First Team All-ABA and posted a 55.9% field goal percentage and averaged 17.6 rebounds per game. Issel led the league in minutes played with 3,531.

The Colonels finished in second place in the Eastern Division with a record of 56 wins and 28 losses. Their average home attendance was 7,113.

The Colonels beat the Virginia Squires 4 games to 1 in the Eastern Division Semifinals and beat the Carolina Cougars 4 games to 3 in the Eastern Division finals. The Colonels then lost a very close ABA Championship Series to the Indiana Pacers, 4 games to 3.

1973–1974
Prior to the Colonels' 1973–74 season the Colonels drafted M.L. Carr and Ron Behagen; Carr stayed in college and Behagen signed with the NBA's Kansas City-Omaha Kings. The Colonels also selected Ernie DiGregorio in a special circumstance draft but he signed with the NBA's Buffalo Braves.

In July 1973 the franchise was bought by a group headed by John Y. Brown, Jr. and his wife Ellie Brown. Ellie Brown was later named Chairman of the Board of the team; the board itself was made up of ten women. Legendary former University of Kentucky head coach Adolph Rupp was named as Vice President of the Board. Mike Storen left the team; he later surfaced with the ABA's Memphis franchise. Former head coach Gene Rhodes became general manager of the team.

Head coach Joe Mullaney departed to become head coach of the Utah Stars. Mullaney was succeeded by Babe McCarthy.

In preseason play against the NBA the Colonels defeated the Houston Rockets 110–102 at Freedom Hall on September 21, 1973 and defeated the Kansas City-Omaha Kings 110–99 the following night.

In January 1974 the Colonels traded Jim O'Brien and a first round draft pick to the San Diego Conquistadors for Red Robbins and Chuck Williams. That same month Kentucky dealt Rick Mount to the Utah Stars for a draft pick and cash, and then sent Mike Gale and Wendell Ladner to the New York Nets for former Colonel John Roche.

Louie Dampier, Dan Issel and Artis Gilmore again played in the ABA All-Star Game, and Babe McCarthy coached the East team. Gilmore was again named the game's Most Valuable Player. Gilmore again posted remarkable statistics including 3,502 minutes played (tops in the league) and 18.3 rebounds per game (Gilmore grabbed 40 rebounds in one game against the New York Nets that season). Louie Dampier posted a league high 38.7% percentage in three-point shots. Babe McCarthy and his Colonels predecessor Joe Mullaney were named ABA Co-Coaches of the Year.

The Colonels posted a regular season record of 53 wins and 31 losses, clinching second place in the Eastern Division. Kentucky's average home attendance for the season was 8,201.

In the playoffs Kentucky defeated the Carolina Cougars 4 games to none in the Eastern Division semifinals but then lost the Eastern Division finals to the New York Nets 4 games to none. Despite being named ABA Coach of the Year, Babe McCarthy was fired at the end of the season.

1974–1975
The Colonels took Jim Price, Greg Smith, Rowland Garrett, Herm Gilliam and Larry Steele in a draft of NBA players, bought Ted McClain from the Carolina Cougars, signed Wil Jones, and traded a draft pick and cash to the San Antonio Spurs for Bird Averitt. The Colonels also sent Al Eberhard to the Denver Nuggets in exchange for Marv Roberts and sent Red Robbins to the Virginia Squires for cash. John Roche was sold to the Utah Stars in the midst of the season. Gene Littles was added to the Colonels roster for the season.

Hubie Brown was named the new head coach of the Colonels.

In preseason play against the NBA the Colonels lost a game in Lincoln, Nebraska to the Kansas City-Omaha Kings 102–91 on September 29, 1974; beat the Washington Bullets 118–95 at Freedom Hall on October 1, 1974; lost by one point on the road to the Houston Rockets on October 5, 1974, 96–95; beat the Detroit Pistons 109–100 at Freedom Hall on October 8, 1974 and on October 12, 1974 defeated the Chicago Bulls at Freedom Hall 93–75.

Louie Dampier, Dan Issel and Artis Gilmore again played in the ABA All Star Game. Gilmore again was First Team All ABA and led the league with 3,493 minutes played.

The Colonels claimed first place in the Eastern Division with a record of 58 wins and 26 losses, but tied with the New York Nets for the division crown. The Colonels' average home attendance was 8,727.

The Colonels began the playoffs with a one-game matchup against the New York Nets to determine who would be first place in the Eastern Division. The Colonels won that game in Louisville 108–99. The Colonels then defeated the Memphis Sounds 4 games to 1 in the Eastern Division semifinals and defeated the Spirits of St. Louis 4 games to 1 in the Eastern Division finals. The Colonels met their rivals the Indiana Pacers for the ABA Championship and the Colonels prevailed, 4 games to 1, winning their first ABA Championship.

Colonels owner John Y. Brown offered $1 million to the NBA Champion Golden State Warriors to play a world title game. The NBA and Golden State refused. Many believe the Colonels were the better team. Hubie Brown went on to coach many teams in the NBA but has always maintained (including in his Naismith Basketball Hall of Fame induction) that the 1974–75 Colonels were the best team he coached.

1975–1976
Prior to the season the Colonels and the ABA's commissioner, Dave DeBusschere, challenged the NBA to have its champion, the Golden State Warriors, face the Colonels in a championship series, the winner of which would get $1 million. The NBA declined. Interest in ABA vs. NBA play extended beyond the two leagues' management. In 1976, CBS sought to establish a postseason playoff between the ABA and NBA, and to win the rights to broadcast those games.

To the dismay of Colonels fans and players, owner John Y. Brown, Jr. dealt star Dan Issel to the Baltimore Claws prior to the season for $500,000; the cash was not forthcoming from the struggling Baltimore franchise and Issel ended up with the Denver Nuggets shortly before the Claws were shut down by the league.

Gene Rhodes was named vice president of operations and David Vance was named general manager for the team.

In preseason play the Colonels defeated the Chicago Bulls, 95–86, at Riverfront Coliseum in Cincinnati on October 1, 1975; lost to the New York Knicks in Landover, Maryland at the Capital Centre, 107–102, on October 4, 1975; defeated the Detroit Pistons 114–113 on October 5, 1975 in Cincinnati; defeated the Milwaukee Bucks 96–91 in Freedom Hall on October 10, 1975; lost an overtime game to the Detroit Pistons in Detroit on October 12, 1975, 115–107; defeated the Buffalo Braves, 120–116, in Freedom Hall on October 14, 1975; defeated the Philadelphia 76ers 112–110 in Cincinnati, Ohio on October 17, 1975; and won another ABA vs. NBA exhibition on October 19, 1975 with a 121–111 victory over the Washington Bullets in Lexington, Kentucky. The game against the Bullets was the penultimate ABA vs. NBA contest; two nights later in the final ABA vs. NBA matchup the Utah Stars defeated the Milwaukee Bucks, 106–101.

The prior year, the NBA declined the ABA champion Colonels' challenge against the NBA champion Golden State Warriors for a $1 million payout. However, the two teams met on October 8, 1975, at Freedom Hall. The Colonels won the matchup of the league champions, 93–90.

The Colonels finished the 1975–76 preseason with a record of 7–2 against NBA teams. The Colonels, like the ABA as a whole, had a winning overall record against the NBA over the course of their existence.

Shortly after the regular season began the San Diego Sails folded and the Colonels picked up Caldwell Jones from their roster. Kentucky then traded Jones to the Spirits of St. Louis for Maurice Lucas. The Colonels also traded Marv Roberts to the Virginia Squires during the season in exchange for Johnny Neumann and Jan van Breda Kolff. Another move in the middle of the season sent Ted McClain to the New York Nets in exchange for $150,000. Allen Murphy, Jimmy Dan Connor, Johnny Neumann, Jimmy Baker, Kevin Joyce and Jim McDaniels joined the Colonels' roster for the 1975–76 season.

Artis Gilmore returned to the ABA All-Star Game and once again was named First Team All ABA. Dampier, after eight straight appearances in that game, was not chosen.

The Colonels finished in fourth place in the Eastern Division with a record of 46–38. Their average home attendance was 6,935.

The Colonels defeated their rivals, the Indiana Pacers, 2 games to 1 in the first round of the playoffs. In the league semifinals, the Colonels and the Denver Nuggets each won three games apiece before Denver claimed Game 7 133–110 at Denver on April 28, 1976. It was the Kentucky Colonels' final game.

Aftermath
The ABA had entered the 1975–1976 preseason with ten teams. After three preseason games, the Baltimore Claws were shut down by the league due to financial problems and unpaid bills. The San Diego Sails and the Utah Stars each folded shortly after the season began, the Sails after 11 games and the Stars after 16. The ABA was reduced to seven teams for the remainder of the season. Shortly after the regular season ended, the Virginia Squires were forced to fold because they could not meet a league-mandated financial assessment. The six remaining ABA teams began negotiations for the eventual ABA–NBA merger. According to Jim Bukata of the ABA, the NBA opposed Kentucky joining the league, and Bill Wirtz of the Chicago Bulls opposed Kentucky joining because Chicago wanted to acquire Kentucky's Artis Gilmore in a dispersal draft.  In the end, the Colonels were not among the four teams the NBA agreed to take in.

On July 17, 1976 the Kentucky Colonels ceased to exist as John Y. Brown, Jr. agreed to fold the Colonels in exchange for $3 million. Brown used the money to purchase the Buffalo Braves of the NBA, bringing Colonels head coach Joe Mullaney and point guard Bird Averitt with him to Buffalo. The Braves are now known as the Los Angeles Clippers.

The Colonels players were put into a dispersal draft. The Chicago Bulls took Artis Gilmore for $1.1 million as they had wished. The Portland Trail Blazers took Maurice Lucas for $300,000. The Buffalo Braves took Bird Averitt for $125,000. The Indiana Pacers took Wil Jones for $50,000. The New York Nets took Jan Van Breda Kolff for $60,000. The San Antonio Spurs took Louie Dampier for $20,000.

In contrast to Brown receiving $3 million in cash for the Colonels, the Spirits of St. Louis' owners received $2.2 million in cash along with a 1/7 share of each of the four remaining teams' television income in perpetuity. That deal netted the Spirits ownership about $300 million until 2014, then the league decided to buy out most the deal for $500 million.

Basketball Hall of Famers

Notes:
 1 Inducted as a player. Never played for the team.
 2 Inducted as a contributor.

Season-by-season

|-
!colspan="6" align=center style="background:#0E3386; color:#FFFFFF; text-align:center; border:2px solid #CC3433;"| Kentucky Colonels
|-
|1967–68 || 36 || 42 || .462 || Won 1968 Eastern Division PlayoffLost 1968 Eastern Division Semifinals || Kentucky Colonels 1, New Jersey Americans 0Minnesota Muskies 3, Kentucky Colonels 2
|-
|1968–69 || 42 || 36 || .538 || Lost 1969 Eastern Division Semifinals || Indiana Pacers 4, Kentucky Colonels 3
|-
|1969–70 || 45 || 39 || .536 || Won 1970 Eastern Division SemifinalsLost 1970 Eastern Division Finals || Kentucky Colonels 4, New York Nets 3Indiana Pacers 4, Kentucky Colonels 1
|-
|1970–71 || 44 || 40 || .524 || Won 1971 Eastern Division SemifinalsWon 1971 Eastern Division FinalsLost 1971 ABA Finals || Kentucky Colonels 4, The Floridans 2Kentucky Colonels 4, Virginia Squires 2Utah Stars 4, Kentucky Colonels 3
|-
|1971–72 || 68 || 16 || .810 || Lost 1972 Eastern Division Semifinals || New York Nets 4, Kentucky Colonels 2
|-
|1972–73 || 56 || 28 || .667 || Won 1973 Eastern Division SemifinalsWon 1973 Eastern Division FinalsLost 1973 ABA Finals || Kentucky Colonels 4, Virginia Squires 1Kentucky Colonels 4, Carolina Cougars 3Indiana Pacers 4, Kentucky Colonels 3
|-
|1973–74 || 53 || 31 || .631 || Won 1974 Eastern Division SemifinalsLost 1974 Eastern Division Finals || Kentucky Colonels 4, Carolina Cougars 0New York Nets 4, Kentucky Colonels 0
|-
|1974–75 || 58 || 26 || .690 || Won 1975 Eastern Division First Place GameWon 1975 Eastern Division SemifinalsWon 1975 Eastern Division FinalsWon 1975 ABA Finals || Kentucky Colonels 1, New York Nets 0Kentucky Colonels 4, Memphis Sounds 1Kentucky Colonels 4, Spirits of St. Louis 1Kentucky Colonels 4, Indiana Pacers 1
|-
|1975–76 || 46 || 38 || .548 || Won 1976 First RoundLost 1976 ABA Semifinals || Kentucky Colonels 2, Indiana Pacers 1Denver Nuggets 4, Kentucky Colonels 3
|-

Broadcast media
Colonels games were broadcast throughout their history on WHAS Radio, the Louisville market's top-rated station at the time and a 50,000-watt clear-channel station, which meant that Colonels broadcasts could be heard over much of the continental United States at night. Van Vance was the play-by-play announcer for nearly all of the games in the franchise's history, with Cawood Ledford (better known as the longtime voice of the University of Kentucky Wildcats) behind the microphone as well, sometimes as color analyst beside Vance.

The Colonels had some games broadcast on various local television stations, but were usually only seen on TV during the ABA network games.

New ABA, New Kentucky Colonels
In 2004, the ABA 2000 brought Louisville a new team with the same name, the Kentucky Colonels.

See also
Kentucky Colonels (ABA 2000)
Sports in Louisville, Kentucky
1968 ABA Playoffs
1969 ABA Playoffs
1970 ABA Playoffs
1971 ABA Playoffs
1972 ABA Playoffs
1973 ABA Playoffs
1974 ABA Playoffs
1975 ABA Playoffs
1976 ABA Playoffs
1973–74 Kentucky Colonels season
1974–75 Kentucky Colonels season

References

External links

Kentucky Colonels history from RememberTheABA.com

 
Basketball teams established in 1967
Basketball teams disestablished in 1976
American Basketball Association teams
Defunct basketball teams in the United States
1967 establishments in Kentucky
1976 disestablishments in Kentucky
Basketball teams in Kentucky